"Far Away Places" is an American popular song. It was written by Joan Whitney and Alex Kramer and published in 1948.

The recording by Bing Crosby & The Ken Darby Choir was recorded on November 25, 1948 and released by Decca Records as catalog number 24532. It first reached the Billboard magazine Best Seller chart on December 31, 1948 and lasted 18 weeks on the chart, peaking at #2.

The recording by Margaret Whiting was released by Capitol Records as catalog number 15278. It first reached the Billboard magazine Best Seller chart on December 17, 1948 and lasted 15 weeks on the chart, peaking at #3.

The recording by Perry Como was released by RCA Victor as catalog number 20-3316. It first reached the Billboard magazine Best Seller chart on January 7, 1949 and lasted 16 weeks on the chart, peaking at #6.

The recording by Dinah Shore was released by Columbia Records as catalog number 38356. It reached the Billboard magazine Best Seller chart on January 28, 1949 at #28 on its only week on the chart.

Recorded versions

Tom Anderson
Ray Anthony orchestra
The Bachelors (1963)
Benny Carter
Don Cherry
Perry Como (1949)
Ray Conniff
Sam Cooke
Bing Crosby & The Ken Darby Choir (recorded November 25, 1948)
Eddie & the Showmen
Ed Ames
Shelby Flint
John Gary
Engelbert Humperdinck
Enoch Light
Vera Lynn
Dean Martin
Glenn Miller
Willie Nelson
Donald Peers, song with orchestra. Conductor: Peter Yorke. Recorded in London on March 26, 1949. It was released by EMI on the His Master's Voice label as catalogue number B 9763.
Gene Pitney
Dinah Shore (1949)
Frank Sinatra
Johnny Hammond Smith
Kate Smith
The Springfields
Lawrence Welk
Margaret Whiting (1949)
Joe Wilder
Young-Holt Unlimited
Willie Nelson with Sheryl Crow (To All the Girls...)

References

1948 songs
Songs written by Joan Whitney (songwriter)
Songs written by Alex Kramer
The Bachelors songs